Ustad Rafaqat Ali Khan is a Pakistani singer-songwriter and musician. Trained as a classical singer, he is the son of the classical music singer Nazakat Ali Khan and nephew of Salamat Ali Khan of Sham Chaurasia gharana. He is the cousin of classical music singer Shafqat Ali Khan. With his career spanning over two decades, Rafaqat Ali Khan has established himself as a successful artist releasing a total of eleven albums.

He also was marked as a playback singer for Krrish, Dhokha and Youngistaan earning widespread acclaim for his singing. In 2016, Khan marked his Coke Studio (Pakistan) debut as a featured artist and sang Tu Kuja Man Kuja in Coke Studio Pakistan (season 9), as a part of the team of Sheraz Uppal (pal).

Early life and career
Rafaqat Ali Khan was born into a musical lineage, the Sham Chaurasia gharana of classical music, to Nazakat Ali Khan. His uncle Salamat Ali Khan was also a singer who sang with his father Nazakat Ali Khan for over half a century. His cousins Shafqat Ali Khan, Shujat Ali Khan and Latafat Ali Khan are all classical singers. Rafaqat graduated from University of Punjab in MA Political Science. Khan started his musical beginnings at very young age and was trained by his father and then uncle. He appeared in television and did shows at Radio together with his uncle and cousins. He then started singing solo and did shows in countries like India, UK, United States, UAE, Canada, Australia, the Middle East, and many European countries. Rafaqat Ali Khan also performed at the All Pakistan Music Conference event in Lahore in 2016. Rafaqat Ali works was featured on the Rishi Rich's album The Project and he has recorded a song with Peter Gabriel.

Rafaqat Ali Khan is also known as a successful playback singer in films Krrish, Dhokha, Silence Please... The Dressing Room, Youngistaan and received Mirchi Music Awards for Song Representing Sufi Tradition at Mirchi Music Awards. His debut was as a featured artist by singing Tu Kuja Man Kuja with Coke Studio Pakistan (season 9), under Sheraz Uppal.

Filmography

Films
 Krrish
 Dhokha
 Awarapan 
 Silence Please... The Dressing Room
 Youngistaan

Discography
 Nishaan
 Maa
 Chand Se Chehre
 Rahat & Rafaqat
 Yaadan Teriyan
 Charkha Gal Karda
 Allah Tera Shukriya

References

External links
  
 
 

Pakistani classical singers
Pakistani classical musicians
Punjabi people
Living people
Singers from Lahore
Year of birth missing (living people)
Vocal gharanas
Classical music in Pakistan